Steamboats in the Port of Rouen is a late 19th-century painting by Camille Pissarro. Done in oil on canvas, the painting depicts shipping in the port city of Rouen, France. Pissarro painted the work from his room in the Hôtel de Paris, which overlooked the one of the city's quays. The painting is similar to Pissarro's Morning, An Overcast Day, Rouen, and both works are in the collection of the Metropolitan Museum of Art.

See also
List of paintings by Camille Pissarro

References

External links

Paintings in the collection of the Metropolitan Museum of Art
Paintings by Camille Pissarro
1896 paintings
Maritime paintings
Ships in art